Genicularina is a genus of green algae, specifically of the Gonatozygaceae.

Genera
Genicularina americana (W.B.Turner) Molinari & Guiry 	
Genicularina elegans (West & G.S.West) Molinari & Guiry
Genicularina spirotaenia (De Bary) Molinari & Guiry

References

External links
 
 AlgaTerra database
 Index Nominum Genericorum

Desmidiales
Charophyta genera